Kesko Corporation is a Finnish retailing conglomerate with its head office in Kalasatama, Helsinki. It is engaged in the grocery trade, building and technical trade, and car trade. It also has operations in Sweden, Norway, Estonia, Latvia, Lithuania, and Poland.

Business purpose
The key focus areas in Kesko's business operations are to strengthen sales growth and the return on capital in all divisions, to exploit business opportunities in e-commerce, and to maintain good solvency and dividend payment capacity.

History
Kesko was formed when four regional wholesaling companies that had been founded by retailers were merged in October 1940.

The new Kesko company started operating at the beginning of 1941. The need to purchase goods for the shareholder-retailers and to support their business operations and start cooperation among them resulted in the forming of the K-retailer group.

By the end of the 1940s, Kesko's sales amounted to about 15 billion old Finnish markkas (equivalent to EUR 580 million in 2010), which was about 12% of the overall sales of the central companies operating in the Finnish trading sector.

Divisions

Grocery trade

Kesko's grocery trade division is a key operator in the Finnish grocery trade. The division's main functions include the centralised purchasing of products, selection management, logistics, and the development of chain concepts and the store network.

The division's grocery store chains are K-Market, K-Supermarket and K-Citymarket. In 2021, the chains comprised 1,200 grocery stores, run by some 1,000 independent K-retailers. Over 500 of the stores also offered online grocery sales services. Approximately 50% of Finns live less than a kilometre away from a K-food store.

Formerly Kesko called these four size-grades of their shops K (small), KK (middle-sized), KKK (large), and KKKK (largest), and the chain names were K Extra, K Lähikauppa (= "local shop"), KK Market, KKK Supermarket and KKKK Citymarket; but this naming system has been changed.

Kesko's grocery private brands include Pirkka, Pirkka Parhaat and K-menu.

The main competitors are Prisma, S-market and Alepa/Sale of S Group, M chain stores, and Lidl.

Kesko company Kespro is the leading wholesaler in the Finnish HoReCa business.

Kesko also has small convenience stores, cafes and restaurants which operate at manned service stations of Neste oil corporation. These service station facilities are branded as Neste K. The convenience store is virtually always found in Neste K station, while whether the station has a cafe or restaurant depends on the size and location of the station. Cafes are branded as Koon Kahvila and restaurants as Koon Keittiö.

K-citymarket's home and speciality goods trade is part of the grocery trade division.

Building and technical trade
Kesko's building and technical trade division operates in Finland, Sweden, Norway, Estonia, Latvia, Lithuania and Poland. Its  chains are Onninen, which serves technical professionals, and K-Rauta, Byggmakker and K-Bygg, which serve both professional builders and consumers. The division also comprises leisure trade and the chains Intersport and Budget Sport.

The division's main functions include the centralised development of chain selections, centralised purchasing and logistics, and the development of chain concepts and the store network.

K-Rauta and Intersport stores in Finland are operated by retailer entrepreneurs. The international business model combines the category management, purchasing, logistics, information system control and network improvements of the company's chains which operate in different countries.

Car trade
The car trade segment consists of K-Auto (formerly operated as VV-Auto).

 K-Auto imports and markets Volkswagen, Audi, Porsche, Cupra, SEAT and Bentley passenger cars, Volkswagen commercial vehicles and MAN trucks in Finland, and it also imports and markets Seat and Cupra in the Baltics.  Kesko’s own outlets and independent dealers sell new and used cars and offer servicing and aftersales services at 71 locations across Finland. The division's K-Lataus network offers electric vehicle charging facilities at K Group store locations around Finland.
 
K-Auto represents the leading brands in their market area and are responsible for the sales and after-sales services of these brands either through their own or dealer network. The dealer network is complemented by a network of contract service centres.

Market share and competitors
In 2014, Kesko's market share in food trade in Finland was 33.1% (Nielsen). At that point, Kesko's competitors in food trade in 2014 were S Group (45.7%), Lidl (7.6%), Suomen Lähikauppa (6.8%), and M chain stores (Nielsen). Kesko later acquired Suomen Lähikauppa in 2016 and the deal increased Kesko's share of the market to about estimated 40%.

In 2019 Nielsen report, Kesko's market share was estimated to be 36.5%.

Acquisition of Suomen Lähikauppa

In April 2016 Kesko completed the acquisition of a competitor Suomen Lähikauppa's stores. In the deal, Kesko acquired all the Valintatalo and Siwa stores. However the Finnish Competition and Consumer Authority (FCCA) approved the acquisition with a condition that Kesko must sell at least 60 of the stores to competitors. All the Siwas and Valintatalos have been rebranded as K-Market stores as of 2017. The total number of stores owned by Suomen Lähikauppa before the acquisition was 643 and it employed 4100 employees. In the same acquisition Kesko also was initially obligated to keep using Tuko Logistics Cooperative as the main supplier for the bought stores for 18 months, but FCCA later revoked this decision on appeal.

Notable changes in company structure

Retail chain closures
Musta Pörssi home electronics retail chain
Kookenkä and Athlete's Foot shoe retailers

Sales of retail chains
Anttila
Asko and Sotka furniture retail chains
Kodin1
Konekesko, a service company specialising in the import, marketing and after-sales services of recreational machinery, construction and materials handling machinery and agricultural machinery. Kesko divested Konekesko operations in 2018-2020

References

External links
 
 K-Auto official website in Finnish language
 Konekesko official website

Companies based in Helsinki
Companies listed on Nasdaq Helsinki
Retail companies of Finland
Supermarkets of Finland
Retail companies established in 1940